Jennie Willemstijn (born 1 December 1977), known by her stage name of Jennie Lena, is a Dutch singer and songwriter.

Early life 
Lena was born in Purmerend, North Holland. She was a part of the Dutch Children's Theatre and won talent shows and competitions in her youth.

Career 

From the age of 5 until 15, Lena participated in various children's theatre productions, and as a  child she would often perform with her mother, who was also a singer and toured around the world.  Often at the end of her mother's shows, Jennie would come out and sing  'Ben', accompanied by her mother on guitar.

In 2007 she won Talent Night, Rotterdam. Also around this time she performed in the United States at the Apollo Theater in Harlem, New York City, and performed several times in Asia. She was a singer for an Amsterdam based band called Food for Funk between 2003 and 2007.

At the age of 25 Jennie studied Theatre Arts, and afterwards decided to focus only on music. In 2009 she started performing backing vocals for Anouk, and it wasn't long before she began to write and record her own songs, making her way as an independent artist.  In 2010 she released her self-written album 'Monsters', and in 2012 she released another album called: 'Life's Like a Chox of Bogglets'.

She  was  noticed  quickly,  and  things  started  to  move  at  a  whirlwind  speed.  Besides  regular  appearances  on  popular,  national  TV  &  radio  shows  in  the Netherlands,  Jennie  also  opened  for  Joss Stone, who invited her on her international tour after watching her videos on the internet.
After that tour, Jennie's own tour started and she performed in many capitals in Europe, Asia and the US, amongst others at the legendary Apollo Theater in Harlem, New York City.

She had been writing songs for multiple musicians in the early and mid 2000s and choose a solo career in 2009. She released her first album Monsters in September 2009. By chance, Lena participated in the Groovalicious tour with Boris & Wicked Jazz Sounds, played at the Eurosonic Festival, and traveled in 2010 by The Netherlands with her own tour "Monsters on Tour". In 2013 Lena released her first album and singles at the record company T2 Entertainment.

On 6 June 2011, her new single Special Delivery came out and on 30 September 2011, the new album Life's Like a Chox or Bogglets appeared, bringing Lena a more comprehensive musical direction. On 19 April 2012 she became the new singer of the band Sven Hammond Soul, until June 2013.

In 2014, her acoustic version of Katy Perry's Firework was heard as a soundtrack in The Interview movie. The American blogger Perez Hilton wrote on his blog that it was the best audition in a singing competition ever.

In 2016, the critically acclaimed Los Angeles-based retro band Postmodern Jukebox (60 million views on YouTube) invited Jennie to make a music video with them and go on tour with them. Jennie is the first European singer they have worked with. The song You Give Love a Bad Name debuted in de Top 10 of the American iTunes Charts Jazz and has millions of views.  In May 2018 she recorded 2 more songs with them.

In 2017 Jennie released an acoustic EP, which entered the iTunes charts at number 1 in the Netherlands.

In April 2018 Jennie released another EP entitled 'Trouble'.  The 1st single from this EP is 'Simple Love'.

Her solo album 'To Be Honest' was released on 12 October 2018.

The Voice of Holland 
In 2015 Lena appeared on The Voice of Holland in Season 6. Her audition which she sang "Who's Loving You" by The Jackson Five accumulated over 100 million views on multiple internet platforms. Her performance was seen by many as the best audition in The Voice franchise history.

Lena made it to the finals, where she came in fourth place.

Music blogger Perez Hilton said: "It wasn't only the best audition for 'the Voice' it was one of the BEST auditions I've EVER seen for a singing competition. Jennie is 1 of my favourite vocalists ever!"

International blogs like 9Gag,Diply,The Huffington Post and LikeMag started blogging about Jennie and stars like Robin Thicke, Kelly Clarkson, Adam Levine, Tyler Perry and Nia Long also shared Jennie's music video's on their social media.

After 'The Voice'  Jennie went to L.A. & New York to perform and started writing for her new album and the international South by SouthWest Festival (SXSW) in Austin Texas invited her to perform.

Personal life 
Lena is fluent in Dutch and English. In 2013, Lena gave birth to a daughter. She is divorced as of 2015.

References

External links 

 Official website

Living people
Dutch women singer-songwriters
21st-century Dutch women singers
Tambourine players
1977 births
People from Purmerend